was a railway station located in Bifuka (美深), Bifuka, Nakagawa District (Teshio), Hokkaidō, and is operated by the Hokkaido Railway Company. The station closed on 13 March 2021.

Lines serviced
Hokkaido Railway Company
Sōya Main Line

Adjacent stations

External links
Ekikara Time Table - JR Minami-Bifuka Station

Railway stations in Hokkaido Prefecture
Railway stations in Japan opened in 1959
Railway stations closed in 2021